Humans

Viral arthritis in Humans (also see: arthralgia) can be caused by:
Parvovirus, especially parvovirus B19
Hepatitis B
Hepatitis C
Rubella
Alphaviruses

Non-Humans
Viral arthritis (poultry), an infectious conditions seen chicken and turkeys